The Avenger-class escort carrier was a class of escort carriers comprising three ships in service with the Royal Navy during the Second World War and one ship of the class in the United States Navy called the Charger Type of 1942-class escort carrier. All three were originally American type C3 merchant ships in the process of being built at the Sun Shipbuilding and Drydock Company Chester, Pennsylvania. The ships laid down in 1939 and 1940 were launched and delivered to the Royal Navy by 1942 under the Lend-Lease agreement.

Aircraft could be housed in the  half hangar below the flight deck. Armament comprised three single mounted 4-inch dual purpose anti-aircraft guns and fifteen 20 mm cannons on single or twin mounts. They had the capacity for fifteen aircraft which would typically be a mixture of Grumman Martlet or Hawker Sea Hurricane fighter aircraft and Fairey Swordfish or Grumman Avenger anti-submarine aircraft. A fourth ship,  was built at the same time to the same design but was commissioned in the U.S. Navy.

Service history

HMS Avenger

HMS Biter

HMS Dasher

USS Charger (CVE-30)

See also

List of ship classes of the Second World War

Notes

References

Escort aircraft carrier classes
 Avenger class escort carrier
 Avenger class escort carrier
Ship classes of the French Navy